AD 90 (XC) was a common year starting on Friday (link will display the full calendar) of the Julian calendar. At the time, it was known as the Year of the Consulship of Domitian and Nerva (or, less frequently, year 843 Ab urbe condita). The denomination AD 90 for this year has been used since the early medieval period, when the Anno Domini calendar era became the prevalent method in Europe for naming years.

Events

By place

Roman Empire 
 The Romans build a small fort for the garrison in the suburbs of modern Regensburg (approximate date).
 Pliny the Younger's appointment as urban quaestor ends. 
 Emperor Domitian and Nerva are Roman Consuls.
 Cologne becomes the capital of Germania Inferior.
 A humiliating peace is bought by Domitian, from King Decebalus of Dacia.
 An epidemic afflicts Rome.

Asia 
 Continuing his conquest of the Tarim Basin, Chinese General Ban Chao defeats the Kushan, led by Kanishka.

By topic

Art 
 The Young Flavian Woman is made. It is now kept at Musei Capitolini, Rome (approximate date).

Literature 
 Roman epic poet Gaius Valerius Flaccus dies, having written works that include the Argonautica, describing the voyage of Jason and the Argonauts to retrieve the Golden Fleece, from the mythical land of Colchis.

Religion 
 The Gospel of John is drafted.
</onlyinclude>

Births 
 Ishmael ben Elishha, Jewish rabbi (approximate date)
 Quintus Tuneius Rufus, Roman politician (approximate date)

Deaths 
 Gaius Valerius Flaccus, Roman poet (approximate date)
 Pedanius Dioscorides, Greek physician (approximate date)
 Tiberius Julius Rhescuporis I, Roman client king

References 

0090